Michael J. "Mike" Richards (born 13 September 1950) is a male Welsh former competitive swimmer.

Swimming career
Richards represented Great Britain at the 1972 Summer Olympics in Munich, Germany.  Richards advanced to the semi-finals of the men's 100-metre backstroke, and posted a time of 1:01.27, finishing 15th overall. At the ASA National British Championships he won the 100 metres backstroke title twice (1970, 1971) and the 200 metres backstroke title twice (1970, 1971).

See also
 List of Commonwealth Games medallists in swimming (men)

References

1950 births
Living people
Sportspeople from Newport, Wales
Male backstroke swimmers
Olympic swimmers of Great Britain
Swimmers at the 1972 Summer Olympics
Welsh male swimmers
Swimmers at the 1970 British Commonwealth Games
Commonwealth Games gold medallists for Wales
Commonwealth Games silver medallists for Wales
Commonwealth Games medallists in swimming
Universiade medalists in swimming
Universiade bronze medalists for Great Britain
Medalists at the 1970 Summer Universiade
Medallists at the 1970 British Commonwealth Games